A Yank at Eton is an American comedy-drama film directed by Norman Taurog for Metro-Goldwyn-Mayer and starring Mickey Rooney, Ian Hunter, and Peter Lawford. Released in 1942, it is a kind of junior thematic sequel to MGM's British-made film A Yank at Oxford (1938). Edmund Gwenn, who played a school official in the earlier film, has a similar role in this one. A Yank at Eton was filmed entirely in the United States.

Plot summary
Timothy Dennis is a cocky American youth who has to move to Britain, where he is sent to attend the elite Eton College. Ronnie Kenvil is an arrogant upperclassman who makes Timothy's life particularly difficult.

Timothy suffers through the problems of the misunderstandings arising from differences between the two countries' cultures, customs and language. At first these differences cause him confusion and anger, particularly against the traditional practices of fagging and physical hazing inflicted at Eton on the lower boys by the uppers. He finds the Etonian manners and behavior as snobbish and stuffy. Eventually young Timothy settles in, stops being rebellious, and comes to realize that, beneath the different habits and views, "Yanks" and "Limeys" have basic values in common and can get along when they have to. At one point he is unjustly accused of sneaking out of his dormitory, stealing a car, and wrecking it on his way home from a night at a tavern, but in the end he proves that Ronnie instead was the culprit.

Cast
 Mickey Rooney as Timothy Dennis
 Edmund Gwenn as Headmaster Justin
 Ian Hunter as Roger Carlton
 Freddie Bartholomew as Peter Carlton
 Marta Linden as Winifred Dennis Carlton
 Juanita Quigley as Jane "The Runt" Dennis
 Alan Mowbray as Mr. Duncan
 Peter Lawford as Ronnie Kenvil
 Raymond Severn as Isaac "Inky" Weeld
 Lyndon Brook as Student (uncredited)
 Harry Cording as Bartender (uncredited)
 Terry Kilburn as Hilspeth (uncredited)

Production notes
The propaganda intent, as U.S. troops poured into the U.K. to join World War II in 1942, was evidently to show that Americans and Britons could set aside their superficial differences and pull together in the war effort. This film contained Lawford's first significant Hollywood role.

The film has the Eton boating song as its theme tune (played at a faster tempo than usual), though no boating is shown in the film.

Reception
According to MGM records, it earned $1,542,000 in the US and Canada and $1,135,000 elsewhere, giving the studio a profit of $1,101,000.

References

External links
 
 
 
 

1942 films
1942 comedy-drama films
Metro-Goldwyn-Mayer films
1940s English-language films
Eton College
Films directed by Norman Taurog
Films scored by Bronisław Kaper
British comedy-drama films
British black-and-white films
Films set in boarding schools
1940s British films